The All-Ireland Senior B Hurling Championship of 1987 was the 14th staging of Ireland's secondary hurling knock-out competition.  London won the championship, beating Carlow 0-20 to 1-15 in the final at Dr. Cullen Park, Carlow.

References

 Donegan, Des, The Complete Handbook of Gaelic Games (DBA Publications Limited, 2005).

1987
B